Raluca Olaru and Xu Yifan were the defending champions, but both players chose not to participate.

Yang Zhaoxuan and Zhang Kailin won the title, defeating An-Sophie Mestach and Storm Sanders in the final, 6–3, 7–6(7–5).

Seeds

Draw

References 
 Draw

Aegon Ilkley Trophy - Doubles
2016 Women's Doubles